The 2007 Pilot Pen Tennis was the 2007 edition of the Pilot Pen Tennis tournament, located in New Haven, Connecticut. It took place on August 17–25, the final week before the U.S. Open began.

James Blake won his second title of the year and 10th overall, while Svetlana Kuznetsova won her first title of the year and 9th overall.

Finals

Men's singles

 James Blake defeated  Mardy Fish 7–5, 6–4

Women's singles

 Svetlana Kuznetsova defeated  Ágnes Szávay, 4–6, 3–0 retired

Men's doubles

 Mahesh Bhupathi /  Nenad Zimonjić defeated  Mariusz Fyrstenberg /  Marcin Matkowski, 6–3, 6–3

Women's doubles

 Sania Mirza /  Mara Santangelo defeated  Cara Black /  Liezel Huber 6–1, 6–2

External links
Men's Singles Draw 1 2
Women's Singles Draw 1 2
Men's Doubles Draw 1 2
Women's Doubles Draw 1 2